Sujita Shakya is a Nepalese politician, belonging to the Nepal Communist Party currently serving as the member of the 1st Federal Parliament of Nepal. In the 2017 Nepalese general election she was elected as a proportional representative from Indigenous peoples category.

References

Nepal MPs 2017–2022
Living people
Communist Party of Nepal (Unified Marxist–Leninist) politicians
1966 births